Mileena is a fictional character in the Mortal Kombat fighting game franchise by Midway Games and NetherRealm Studios. Introduced in Mortal Kombat II (1993), she is a clone of the Edenian princess Kitana, created with the blood of the fictional Tarkatan species. Her creation results in her developing the deformed facial features of the Tarkatan, which she conceals with a veil. A power-hungry, unstable villain throughout most of the series, Mileena uses a pair of sai as her primary weapons. She is also the love interest of the Tarkatan warrior Baraka or Edenian traitor Tanya.

Despite some criticism for her revealing character designs, Mileena has received a positive reception for her unique appearance and personality. She has been featured in various media outside of the games and is one of the franchise's most popular characters.

Appearances

Mortal Kombat games
After the ruler of the other-dimensional realm Outworld, Shao Kahn, conquered the realm of Edenia and merged it with his own, he decided he would keep the former king's daughter Kitana alive and raise her as his own. Though she grew up knowing nothing of her origin, the emperor nonetheless feared that one day Kitana would discover her true parentage and turn against him, so he ordered the sorcerer Shang Tsung to create a more vicious and loyal version of Kitana who can take her place if necessary using the essence of a Tarkatan warrior. However, the process was not a complete success, as the hybrid clone has a Tarkatan's hideous mouth. Instead of replacing Kitana, Mileena instead would be used to spy on her and ensure her allegiance to Shao Kahn. To facilitate this, he introduced Mileena to Kitana as her supposedly lost twin sister. While the two grew up together as his daughters and elite personal assassins, Mileena grew to harbor a great bitterness and jealousy towards Kitana, whom the Kahn favored over her.

As the Kahn feared, Kitana discovers the truth about her past and Mileena is ordered to keep close watch over her rival when Kitana secretly allies with Earthrealm warriors during the events of Mortal Kombat II (1993). While Mileena is determined to stop her twin at any cost, she is murdered by Kitana, her soul descending into the Netherrealm. In the 2005 beat'em up, Mortal Kombat: Shaolin Monks, a retelling of Mortal Kombat II, Mileena fights Liu Kang and Kung Lao alongside Jade and Kitana, but is defeated by the two Shaolin warriors and flees to the Wasteland to seek help from Goro.

Damned to the Netherealm after her death, Mileena swears fealty to its ruler Shinnok. During the events of Ultimate Mortal Kombat 3 (1995), Shao Kahn decides to resurrect Mileena to help him defeat Earthrealm's chosen warriors, magically granting her the ability to read Kitana's thoughts. Shinnok sees this as an opportunity to covertly monitor the events unfolding in Earthrealm and allows her to return to life. After Shao Kahn is defeated, Mileena is summoned back to the Netherealm. In Mortal Kombat Gold (1999), she assists in Shinnok's invasion of Edenia, but allows her sister to escape from a dungeon. Following Shinnok's defeat, Mileena comes to Kitana's palace and demands the power over Edenia be shared with her. Kitana refuses before defeating and imprisoning Mileena.

Mileena remains imprisoned for years until Onaga the Dragon King launches his own invasion of Edenia, during which she is freed by her ally Baraka. During the events of Mortal Kombat: Deception (2004), Mileena is ordered by Onaga to pose as Kitana in order to confuse and misdirect his enemies. However, as Mileena begins the game's titular deception, she develops a hidden agenda and decides to take control of Edenia's forces and Onaga's undead army for herself. In the game's Konquest Mode, Mileena also trains the young Shujinko in Outworld and fights against Jade.

In Mortal Kombat: Armageddon (2006), Mileena seizes Shao Kahn's fortress while maintaining her Kitana guise and decides to continue her charade until the Edenian forces are corrupted enough to follow her under her true identity. Though at first confident that Outworld is hers to rule, Mileena is forced to reveal herself and surrender to the returning Shao Kahn when he mounts an offensive against the fortress to re-instate himself as ruler. The emperor then commands Mileena to capture Shujinko, who would be used as a bargaining chip in gaining Onaga as an ally. Mileena succeeds and takes Shujinko to Shao Kahn's palace. Having tasted power for herself however, she is no longer content with being his minion and still plans to get the Edenian throne back for herself. She is later killed by Shang Tsung during the battle for Blaze's power.

Mileena returns in Mortal Kombat (2011), an alternative-timeline retelling of the original Mortal Kombat trilogy. In this game, Mileena was created by Shang Tsung in the "Flesh Pit" and introduced during the second tournament instead of many years earlier. Meant to be a loyal replacement for Kitana, she is physically and mentally damaged, her animalistic rage controlled only by Shao Kahn as she uses her lascivious behavior to lure victims and then slaughter and devour them. In the game's story mode, she serves as an opponent for Kitana, Jade, Stryker, and Kabal, and is referred to by Shao Kahn as his "true daughter", succeeding him after his death by Raiden's hand. The game's Challenge Tower mode sees Mileena killing Shang Tsung and absorbing his soul while Kitana's non-canonical ending shows her being unusually sympathetic towards Mileena.

Mileena returned as a playable character in Mortal Kombat X (2015). Though she became empress of Outworld after Shao Kahn's death, Mileena is overthrown by Kotal Kahn after Reptile reveals her origins, with her followers either killed or siding with Kotal Kahn. Refusing to accept defeat, Mileena resolves to reclaim the throne with the power of Shinnok's amulet. Allying herself with Rain, Tanya, and Kano, Mileena launches an unsuccessful surprise attack on Kotal Kahn in Outworld and is captured. She uses the amulet to protect herself from execution, but is overcome by its power before being rescued and taken away by Rain. She is later tracked down by Cassie Cage, who worked with D'Vorah to apprehend Mileena and recover the amulet. Mileena fights D'Vorah, but is defeated and brought to Kotal Kahn. He orders Mileena to be executed by D'Vorah, who subjects her to flesh-eating parasites.

Mileena returned in Mortal Kombat 11 as part of the Kombat Pack 2 DLC released on November 17, 2020. Due to popular demand by fans, Ed Boon has also added Mileena to Kitana's friendship. This particular version of Mileena originates from the past during the second tournament, having been brought to the present by Kronika, and learns of her future self's death.

Design
Mileena was the first evil female character to appear in the series, created by John Tobias for Mortal Kombat II simply to accommodate another palette-swapped character. Tobias recalled: "I took advantage of Kitana and Mileena being masked sisters to make a play on the veil myth… One sister is beautiful. One is ugly. One is good. One is evil. Choose wisely before asking one on a date." Mortal Kombat co-creator and producer Ed Boon described the sisters as the "female versions of Scorpion and Sub-Zero", and the character indeed emerged as saw Tobias' sketch of a veiled female warrior and suggested creating a duplicate similar to the ninjas. Tobias does not remember the exact origin of the name Mileena, but he felt "it had a pleasant sound to it, which either helped hide her grotesque appearance or exposed a hidden inner beauty". According to Acclaim Entertainment's producer Robert O'Farrell, the game was given two female fighters so it would better compete against Capcom's Street Fighter II, which had only one.  

Since her debut, Mileena's characteristic weapon is a pair of sharpened, dagger-like sai, that at first, she has been using in combat only as projectiles and during some of her finishing moves (eventually, the sai were given more use in Mortal Kombat 2011). Only in Mortal Kombat Gold does she use a European style longsword (similar to that of Scorpion in Mortal Kombat 4) as her primary physical weapon. Prior to the release of MK2011, Mileena was one of the five "legendary characters" spotlighted by Warner Bros. Interactive Entertainment, alongside the likes of Scorpion and Sub-Zero. Her MK2011 X-ray attack was altered to incorporate sai stabbings after fan feedback "to fit Mileena as far as her style, her brutality." Her trademark moves through the series include double-sai throws that can be performed midair, teleport kicks, and on-ground rolling attacks. Mileena also utilizes her sai in most of her Fatalities, including immobilizing her opponents prior to the killing sequence (such as her "Rip Off" finisher in MK2011), while she pretends to kiss her victims in others. In MKX, both of her Fatalities exhibit her cannibalistic traits. There was a popular but completely false urban legend-style rumor regarding a supposed "Nudality" finishing move in MKII. Her Animality in Ultimate Mortal Kombat 3 and Mortal Kombat Trilogy sees her transform into a skunk that sprays the defeated opponent.

Mileena is physically identical to Kitana, the most glaring exception being her half-Tarkata with large and exposed sharp teeth (which got noticeably downsized for Mortal Kombat: Deception and Armageddon). Boon described Mileena as "Anti-Kitana" and said that her large "sharp, nasty teeth" have been not originally planned and were only drawn for her infamous Fatality "Man-Eater" (featured in UMK3 too), in which she sucks up the entire body of her victims and then regurgitates their clean bones. After MKII, her teeth were almost never used again during gameplay until MK2011 (in a leap attack to bite an opponent in the neck and in one Fatality to gnaw on the killed enemy's severed head), with a sole exception of one Fatality in Deception in which she uses them to tear off the opponent's head. Mileena's skin color appears to be at times mildly darker than Kitana's but is always lighter than Jade's. After the two were given more varying appearances in Gold (hairstyle of all Kitana-derived characters is loose in MKII and pinned back in a bun in UMK3), Mileena's hair is usually much shorter than Kitana's and is most often worn gathered in a ponytail. One element of Mileena's anatomy that has often changed is her eyes. As her supposed twin sister, Mileena shared Kitana's eyes in MKII; her eyes then became "undead" style all-white (similar to the eyes of Scorpion and Noob Saibot) in UMK3. In Deception, Armageddon and Shaolin Monks, Mileena's eyes return to normal but are yellow (Kitana's eyes are brown). In Mortal Kombat 2011, however, she has Baraka-like yellow eyes with slit pupils (her eyes are also sometimes seen as glowing whole), except for her alternate UMK3 style costume (available through pre-order bonuses and later in a DLC package) in which she has human eyes once again. In MKX, her facial appearance has undergone major changes in her facial appearance based on those from Mortal Kombat Legacy live-action series, such as having a human-like mouth, yet still retain most of her Tarkatan mouth, as seen on both of her cheeks.

Mileena's main color has been either a shade of pink or magenta in various installments (including when masquerading as Kitana in Deception) and their outfits did not differ in a significant way (more than just having different color patterns) until Gold. Since then, her costumes have been generally getting more skimpy with every new game, including always having an exposed midriff since Deception. Mileena's main costume in Deception and Armageddon is actually mostly black and features long flowing arm sleeves, a back-only loincloth, and a partially transparent veil. In Shaolin Monks, Mileena appears half-naked (her costume made largely of just belts of leather and scraps of fabric), barefoot (with a bandaged midfoot), and again wearing a veil in place of a mask (the veil returns as part of her formal outfit in MK2011). In the 2011 reboot game, her prime costume is based on her famous provocative alternate from Deception, but more detailed and again featuring a mask. In all, in this game she has the largest number of costumes out of all characters in the entire series. Her "Flesh Pit" alternate costume in the 2011 game is made of just some loose bandages put around her otherwise completely naked body, marking the first time that she has appeared unmasked by default. "The Ultimate Horror Pack" DLC for MKX features the Vampiress Mileena.

Like Kitana and Jade, Mileena has been originally portrayed by Katalin Zamiar in MKII, who was using her own sai. A false rumor printed in Game Informer told of a Mileena-like secret character named Emerald supposedly hidden in the game. After MKII, Mileena was first filmed during the very early development, then officially declared by Tobias and Boon to be "gone" and not returning, and eventually brought back due to popular demand, with Becky Gable taking over the role in UMK3. Her motion capture actors for 3D games have included Carlos Pesina in Deception and Armageddon, but in MK2011 she was played by a female actor.

Gameplay
Mileena has been commonly perceived as one of the top (or even the best) characters of Mortal Kombat II in gameplay terms. Game Players described her as a "big purple flash that bolts across the screen and kicks your tail before you even knew the round started." She was ranked as the game's best overall fighter by Sega Visions for her high speed and reach as well as her teleport kick that can uniquely dodge the opponent's projectiles. Super Play too called her "the best MKII character" as she is "fast, with a good range of attacks, and the potential for the most awesome combo in the game." EGM noted about how this "deadly woman...can hold her own against any man in the game" as her players can use her "lightning speed" and the sai blasts to overcome other players, while C+VG evaluated all of MKII characters as "well-balanced" and "potentially excellent", but still the teleport kick of the "very fast" Mileena was singled out by them as "the best surprising move in the game." According to CU Amiga, Mileena was "third only to Jax and Liu Kang for sheer brilliance," being a "somewhat misleading character" whose moves need to be "learnt the right way to put them all together to be devastating." Hyper verdicted that in the hands of the skilled players, all three "Mileena, Jax and Liu Kang are almost unstoppable," and Amiga Concept chose the "almost unassailable" Mileena as the game's best character alongside Jax. In GamePro test, the "queen of the hill" Mileena was effective against all characters, and especially versus Jax (who shared tier 1 with her in their ranking), Reptile and Shang Tsung. GamePro testers opined that "although Jax is the better overall characters against Tiers 2-4, Mileena's massive advantage over him makes her number one. Neither suffers disadvantages against anyone else. With her rapid sai-throwing ability, teleport attacks, and deadly combos, this beautiful assassin lands atop our rankings." In Amiga Format test matches, both Mileena and Kitana were always "so much faster" that "poor Jax...ended getting his head kicked in every time."

Mileena is a hidden playable character in Ultimate Mortal Kombat 3, for which she needs to be unlocked with a special "Kombat Kode", but is available from the start in the compilation game Mortal Kombat Trilogy (appearing as seen in UMK3). Sega Saturn Magazine stated "she's pretty much identical to the last time," meaning MKII. According to Nintendo Power, Mileena's original powers "may prove insufficient" for using her with the same effectiveness in UMK3 in which most of the other characters got some additional special moves. On the other hand, Total 64 wrote that Mileena of Trilogy (directly based on UMK3 version) is "a damn good fighter [with] plenty of powerful moves" making her "an all round classy fighting star." EGM Strategy Guide for UMK3 noted she has largely retained her ability to "zone" the opponent with her sai projectiles, which had contributed to making her "one of the toughest" characters in MKII.

According to GameSpy's guide to Mortal Kombat: Deception, Mileena "has some solid offensive tools" and "a few solid combos up her sleeve, as well as a few pop-up attacks that are extremely quick and open up brief juggle opportunities," however she now also has severe weaknesses such as a very short range of her sai and poor ranged attack abilities. Prima Games' official guide for a Deception-based Mortal Kombat Armageddon gave Mileena an overall rating of 6/10, calling her a "punisher" type character and a better fighter than Kitana ("seems to have the upper hand between the two"), but while she "is able to punish from any range and even interrupt high attacks and projectiles, the damage she inflicts is minor."

In Prima Games' official guide for the 2011 Mortal Kombat reboot, Mileena was judged to be well-balanced and universal, displaying neither particular weaknesses nor advantages that would result in a one-sided battle against anyone else. In their test, Mileena always won around half of the fights against any character (in the range of 40–60%, wins depending on an opposing character). In Mortal Kombat X, Mileena's style of fighting is translated into her three variations: "Ravenous", "Piercing", and "Ethereal". In "Ravenous", as the name suggests, Mileena gains an expanded number of biting and pouncing attacks, highlighting her beastly and cannibalistic tendencies and turning her into a more aggressive fighter. In "Piercing", her main trait is her sai, which she uses for both projectiles and extensive combination attacks. Her "Ethereal" variation focuses on her ability to teleport and allows her to disappear for extended periods of time in order to strike stealthily. Prima evaluated her as a "solid character" with "several great ways to stop opponents from jumping toward her," but who is "not as safe as some of the other characters, which means she has to take a few risks."

Mileena is not playable in Mortal Kombat: Shaolin Monks wherein she only appears as a sub-boss character alongside Kitana and Jade, as well as an optional boss in a secret stage encounter. Mileena also appears in the super deformed-style "cute" form in every minigame through the series: "Chess Kombat", "Puzzle Kombat" and "Motor Kombat". In "Motor Kombat", Mileena's Kombat Karting special weapon is a brief speed boost that is very useful to save her from a Fatality in a death trap or at the finish line and makes her a "great character" to use in the arena Speedster. When playing offline, it also allows the player to "steal first place right at the finish line before the AI gets its own miraculous speed boost." An overpowered version of Mileena is a Faction Invasion boss for the Outworld faction in MKX.

Other media

Mileena had a brief role in the 1994 Midway-produced Mortal Kombat II comic book that was written and illustrated by John Tobias, and took place prior to the second tournament. She joins Kitana, Baraka, Kintaro and Shang Tsung in being sent to attack Earthrealm by Shao Kahn, and kills Jax's Special Forces partner Steve Beran by performing her "Maneater" Fatality off-panel. She was a recurring secondary character in Malibu Comics' Mortal Kombat series that was published from 1994 to 1995. Making her debut in the first issue of the Goro: Prince of Pain miniseries, she is part of a team led by Kitana with orders to find the missing Goro in Outworld. She additionally has reservations about Kitana's true loyalty to Kahn (though she never speaks about it to anyone) and considers herself to be the loyal "Shao Kahn's true daughter." Mileena is paired with Reptile in Battlewave, and duels Sonya Blade twice—including the first "Tournament Edition" finale in which she stabs Sonya with her sai—but she loses both times. She was also featured in a one-shot special entitled Kitana and Mileena: Sister Act, which explained their past: Mileena is a creation ordered by Shao Kahn, though he would never let her replace Kitana.

Mileena was a minor character in the Mortal Kombat: Live Tour stage show in 1995, where she was played mostly by Jennifer DeCosta and Lexi Alexander in a dual role. They primarily played Kitana but wore Mileena's costume underneath for a quick wardrobe change as Mileena would reveal herself to the heroes Jax and Liu Kang after having led them into Shao Kahn's trap while impersonating Kitana. She was the only player character at the time absent from the first Mortal Kombat film.

Mileena appeared briefly in the 1997 feature film Mortal Kombat: Annihilation, and was played by martial artist and stuntwoman Dana Hee. She was featured in one scene in which she ambushes Sonya Blade from behind in a desert. The two duel before Sonya traps Mileena on the ground and kicks her in the head, snapping her neck. After this, Mileena's shoulder tattoo comes to life and flies away. Mileena herself was never mentioned by name but was acknowledged in the closing credits. Her pink-and-black costume was a palette swap of Kitana's main film attire (a sleeveless bustier-like top and tights) with an added mask and matching headband and has blue eyes. Mileena has only one spoken line in the film ("You wish" in response to Sonya confusing her with Kitana) and it was the only time she has ever been shown with her hair in a plait, similar to Kitana's in-film hairstyle. Hee described her role as "an evil, mysterious figure that leaves you wondering, 'Who is she?'" Her fight against Sonya Blade was shot in -3° Celsius (26° Fahrenheit) weather at a copper mine in Wales, and the crew had trucked in synthetic mud for the scene, but a hurricane struck near the set a day before filming and left both actresses and their stunt performers fighting in actual mud. Mileena's character and the fight scene have been originally quite different in Brent V. Friedman and Bryce Zabel's scripts for the film.

In Jerome Preisler's novelization of Mortal Kombat Annihilation, based on the film's scripts, Mileena has teamed up with Smoke, but she is still killed by Sonya after an ensuing fight scene, albeit by different means. In Preisler's novel, Mileena appears in a scene similar to this in the film but instead set in a mist-covered jungle wilderness. She ambushes Sonya while Smoke attacks Jax, and she is depicted as being an unmasked "angular, exotic-looking woman with eyes like burning coals, and a body as tautly well-conditioned as her smile was vicious", laughing a burst of insane and inhuman laughter. Mileena scissor-grips Sonya's neck with "her powerful thigh muscles" before being thrown off by Sonya. She then introduces herself after this initial confrontation, adding that she does not appreciate being confused with her "virtuous half-sister." Eventually, Sonya fatally strangles Mileena with the handle of her own sai after a second fight, and when she and Jax examine Mileena's corpse, Sonya wonders if Mileena was just "another cyborg" after spotting a shoulder tattoo similar to the mark found on Cyrax.

Mileena appeared in the 1999 episode "Shadow of a Doubt" of the television series Mortal Kombat: Konquest, in which she had no direct relation to Kitana and was here depicted as an initially very repulsive and aggressive Outworld warrior sent by Shao Kahn to assassinate the weakened Kung Lao, with a magic spell placed over her to give her Kitana's look (for a while, he even called her his "new daughter"). Mileena, wearing a green costume, succeeded in seducing Kung Lao, but could not bring herself to kill him during their night of passion. She makes excuses for Kahn and later fights an inconclusive duel against Kitana, broken by Shao Kahn. As punishment for her taking too much time in her mission, Kahn allows Mileena to keep her beauty with the exception of making her teeth exaggeratedly pointed. She then starts to wear her signature mask, which Kahn gives her before banishing her from his sight. In Konquest, Mileena was portrayed by Meg Brown and Audie England played Mileena pretending to be Kitana. Mileena's costumeis very similar to that in Annihilation but she has different hair.

Mileena was supposed to return in the third Mortal Kombat film that has not been made despite multiple attempts, including the early 2010s reboot project by Kevin Tancharoen. In 2018, she was revealed as included in a current reboot project, planned to be directed by Simon McQuoid in the script written by Greg Russo.

Another alternative and younger version of Mileena appears in Tancharoen's 2011 live-action webisode series Mortal Kombat: Legacy, portrayed by martial artist Jolene Tran in her acting debut. Their story is told in the two-part episode "Kitana & Mileena," which featured both animated and live-action sequences. Mileena is shown to be a Shang Tsung-created clone like in the games, but of an age similar to Kitana's, as they were together since their infancy, and her scarred but otherwise normal-looking mouth (with lips, except as a baby) changes as her teeth grow when she is overcome by a cannibalistic rage. The adolescent Mileena is clad in violet, does not appear to be Kitana's twin, and is seen wearing a mask only in some of the animated sections (in which both of them are wearing outfits similar to those in Mortal Kombat II). She is shown spar-dueling against Kitana and losing to her, then killing and devouring a palace guard in a fit of insanity, as well as killing impostors of King Jerrod, Kitana's biological father, in a team together with Kitana. When the two are eventually sent by Shao Kahn on a mission to assassinate the actual King Jerrod, Mileena kills him with a double sai throw to the chest when he was talking to Kitana. Mileena returned for the 2013 second season of Legacy with actress Michelle Lee (Ada Wong in Resident Evil 6) replacing Tran, who had posted on Twitter without explanation that she would not be returning. Lee called Mileena "such an awesome character" while playing her was her "dream come true." Mileena fights and beats Johnny Cage before being defeated and decapitated by Kitana, who rescues an injured Cage just as he is about to die.

Sisi Stringer portrays Mileena in the 2021 reboot film Mortal Kombat.

In DC Comics' 2015 Mortal Kombat X prequel miniseries, Sonya Blade is asked by Emperor Kotal Kahn to help him defeat Mileena, his rival to the throne of Outworld. She has joined forces with Reiko, who becomes her advisor and lover. When Goro disappears after being sent in pursuit of Mileena, Kotal Kahn sends his father, Kotal K'etz—armed with Shao Kahn's magic hammer—to kill both her and Reiko. However, Kotal's most trusted warriors are ambushed and slaughtered by Mileena's forces that include Mavado's Red Dragon mercenaries. K'etz himself is then killed by Goro recruited by Mileena. After Ermac later informs Mileena of Kahn's machinations in Outworld, and Rain—recuperating under Mileena's care after having been burned by Kahn in the seventh chapter—reveals Reiko's true allegiance with Havik, Mileena forms a temporary alliance with Kahn and the Earthrealm warriors to stop Reiko and the Red Dragon. Upon reaching Shang Tsung's island, she defeats Skarlet with assistance from Ermac, then smashes Reiko's head with Shao Kahn's war hammer, a blow he survives due to Havik's "Blood Code" curse.

Merchandise and promotion
In October 2004, Mileena was featured in a spread in the special edition of Playboy magazine that spotlighted provocative video game characters. A famous promotional picture of her, known as "Sexy Mileena" (a topless picture in her alternative costume from Mortal Kombat: Deception) was created for this purpose by Midway Games artist Pav Kovacic. This image did not actually appear in Playboy (in which a fairly common picture of Mileena in her primary costume in Deception was published instead) but was used as an unlockable picture for an in-game gallery. There was also another image which was made for a later Playboy issue. A full-clothed image of Mileena was used as one of five alternative cover arts for "Kollector Edition" limited version of Deception for the Xbox video game console and a pin-up of Mileena was featured in IGN's Hotlist publication in 2006. Michelle Lee filmed a short gag clip for Machinima.com titled "Mileena's Lunch," as part of the promotion of the second season of Legacy.

Mileena was extensively used to promote the Mortal Kombat reboot game in 2011–2012. She was one of the only four playable characters in the demo version and was featured in several trailers, including "A Night Out With Mileena" in which several NetherRealm Studios employees tongue-in-cheek-style answered the question where they would take her on a date. As part of this promotional campaign, fitness model Danni Levy portrayed Mileena in the live-action trailer "Kasting" and a photo session, attending The Gadget Show: World Tour for the European 2011 championship in Mortal Kombat. Levy also portrayed Mileena in the 2012 live-action commercial for the PlayStation Vita version of the game; first in a teaser trailer, and then in the full trailer together with Kitana. Playboy model Jo Garcia dressed up in Mileena's colors to play as her in a sponsored photo session and video in 2011. Another model dressed as Mileena also promoted the 2011 game in Brazil for Warner Bros. and Saraiva Mega Store. A Mortal Kombat II style costume for Mileena was first added exclusively for the Vita version of Mortal Kombat 2011, before being later included in the Komplete Edition release for the other platforms.

A figurine of Mileena ("the evil twin") from Mortal Kombat II came out exclusively with a special issue of the Argentinian magazine Top Kids in 1995. A 7.5-inch action figure that was also based on her design in this game was released by Infinite Concepts in 1999, with a detachable mask. A ten-inch polystone statue of her Mortal Kombat 2011 incarnation was released in Syco Collectibles' Enchanted Warriors series in 2012. Pop Culture Shock Collectibles released a 1/4 scale statue of "Klassic" Mileena from Ultimate Mortal Kombat 3 in 2015, followed by a 1/3 scale (28 in / 71 cm tall) statue from Mortal Kombat X in 2018.

Mileena was one of the faces of Mortal Kombat: Deception during and after its release, including the game's special edition for the Xbox that featured her likeness, and a promotional metal card with her biography. She was featured in the 1995 collectible card game Mortal Kombat Kard Game, as well as in the 2006 crossover collectible card game Epic Battles where she is one of the characters representing the Mortal Kombat universe that were featured already in the Premiere Edition. An electronic music track called "Mileena's Theme" by Tokimonsta was released in 2011 as the first of three singles that were compiled on the album Mortal Kombat: Songs Inspired by the Warriors. Mileena is one of several MK characters featured on 2.5" x 3.5" collectible magnets by Ata-Boy and Halloween costumes of her have been also sold.

Reception

Cultural impact
Mileena has made several homage cameo appearances outside of the Mortal Kombat franchise, including in the comic book series Gen13 in 1995, in the episode "Another Bad Thanksgiving" of the animated series The Cleveland Show in 2010, and in a comedy sketch by Animation Domination High-Def in 2015. In the 1996 martial arts film Book of Swords, there is a nod/tribute to Mileena in a minor role by Katalin Zamiar herself. Furthermore, Mileena might have served as an inspiration in some other cases.

The "celebrities" who have cosplayed as the character have included Canadian film maker Sylvia Soska at Fantastic Fest 2011, the Fourth Vice-Miss Poland (Teenagers) 2013 Adrianna Schneider, professional wrestler and model Eden Stiles (Brandi Runnels) for Halloween in 2013, American model and media personality Adrianne Curry at San Diego Comic-Con 2013 and later at Fan Expo Canada 2014, American MMA fighter Roxanne Modafferi at Invicta Fighting Championships weigh-ins, and Polish boxer Ewa Brodnicka at a before-fight gala in 2017, Also to promote MK2011, UFC's Playboy's Jo Garcia dressed up in a purple costume and played as Mileena in the game in a Playboy vlog. Gail Kim dressed up as Mileena for Impact Wrestling's Halloween photoshot along with Velvet Sky as Kitana. American professional wrestler Zelina Vega, among others. In November 2020, American rapper Megan thee Stallion cosplayed as Mileena to promote her addition as DLC in Mortal Kombat 11: Ultimate Edition. Some people even named their children after Mileena, which became popular in 2015.

Popularity
Mileena's addition to the series was well received and she quickly became one of the most popular and recognizable Mortal Kombat characters. Her debut appearance in Mortal Kombat II was met with a favorable critical reception, with for example Nintendo Power characterizing her as "beautiful, graceful, beguiling and strong, but most of all, deadly." The Miami Herald called Kitana and Mileena an "interesting step toward political correctness" as "a far cry from Little Miss Muffet" and Austin American-Statesman described them as "far nastier than that martial-artless aerobics instructor from the first game." Similarly, GamesMaster opined that it is a "naughty streak in Mileena that makes her so attractive. Coupled with a pair of firm biceps." Some publications regarded her as the symbol of the game, including Consoles+ and Video & Games that each positioned her as an equivalent of, respectively, Cammy and Ryu from Super Street Fighter II. A retrospective article by IGN's Richard George listed "the hot chicks" as one of the reasons why MKII "is considered by many to be the pinnacle of the series," while UGO named the both "busty ninja sisters" as front characters of the franchise.

Like Chun-Li from Street Fighter, Mileena also quickly became a popular among female audience, including the actress Samantha Jo when she was a child. In 1996, Reyda Seddiki from French magazine Player One noted that the "wickedly gracious" Mileena has always been his preference of all the characters since her introduction. The Birthday Massacre vocalist Chibi (Sara Elaine Taylor) described Mileena as one of her "heroes" when she announced her plan of getting a tribute tattoo, saying she likes her "because she's pretty insane and vicious and seems like she'd be very attractive, but then has this mouth full of heinous sharp teeth." Rapper Princess Nokia (Destiny Frasqueri) also listed Mileena among her favourite female game characters.

UGO rated Mileena 17th on their 2012 list of the top 50 Mortal Kombat characters, citing her then-rare presence as an evil female player character (a taboo-breaking novelty in video games at the time of her 1993 MKII debut) while stating that her brutal attacks and "slutty" outfits made her a fan favorite. Den of Geek placed Mileena fifth (14 spots ahead of Kitana) in their 2015 rating of the series' 73 playable characters. IGN, in 2011, listed her as one of the series' "four main characters" alongside mainstays Liu Kang, Scorpion and Sub-Zero. Anurag Ghosh and Bill Fulks of Bright Hub included her among the top ten "awesome" Mortal Kombat characters as well as one of the sexiest ("second only to the gorgeous Kitana"), and CraveOnline's Dread Central called her "without question" one of the "most beloved" characters in the Mortal Kombat universe. Fans voted her the series' 20th greatest character in a 2013 online poll hosted by Dorkly. Marcin Górecki of Secret Service placed her ninth on his list of the best female fighters in the fighting genre's history in 1996.

Looks, attitude and finishing moves
Reception to the character's conflicting looks and psychotic and later (in the 2011 reboot) also childish behavior has been mixed, though with elements such as her sexual allure and shock value well received, particularly in regards to her Fatalities. GamesRadar UK recalled about Mortal Kombat II: "we had two nigh-identical twins of svelte, slinky sex and gore...But then Milly took off her mask and it all went wrong. Horribly, nightmarishly, ball-shrinkingly wrong." As told by Joey Esposito of MTV, Mortal Kombat II "added ... sexually suggestive characters in Mileena and Kitana, but the tables were turned" with Mileena's "Man Eater" Fatality, which he ranked among the nine Mortal Kombat Fatalities "that warped your childhood." CU Amiga called it "the kiss of death to end all kisses". Mileena shared seventh place with Kitana on GamesRadar's 2006 list of top seven "girls kissing girls" in 2006, and Paul Drury of Retro Gamer elected "Kitana's and Mileena's deadly kisses" as his favorite Fatalities. In 2011, Topless Robot's Ryan Aston ranked Mileena as the sixth-most goofy Mortal Kombat character for her absurd "Man-Eater" finisher, but nevertheless calling her "quite the looker". Complex ranked Mileena's biting off an opponent's head as the eighth-best finishing move in the series, noting "a sexual element that was creepily out of context." In 2012, Game Rant ranked Mileena's "just sick" 'Yummy' finisher from Mortal Kombat: Deception as the series' second-best Fatality of all time. Kotaku included her "Nail Shooter" Fatality from Ultimate Mortal Kombat 3 among their choices of the "most gruesome" video game deaths in 2013, commenting it was "not necessarily the bloodiest one, but definitely one of the funniest." GamesRadar's Jack DeVries called the Vita version of MK2011, "as pretty as Mileena minus mask, but overall, just as viciously fun."

In spite of her disfigured face, Mileena has been often rated among the most attractive characters in video games. Brazilian magazine Ação Games placed her and Kitana at the eight spot on their list of "Top Girls" in 1997. UGO Networks counted Mileena among the best-looking female ninja-type characters in all media, further ranking her as the "seventh-finest" female fighter in 2010, despite "that big scary demon mouth she keeps under the skarf." Alongside Mileena and Jade, Kitana was included on the list of the "hottest chicks" of 2011 by Univision. That same year, Ben Kendrick of Game Rant ranked Mileena as the "fourth-most awesome" character of the series and one of the "most disgusting yet alluring" game characters ever created. Mileena's breasts placed 31st and ninth on the lists of the finest chests in gaming by GameFront's Ross Lincoln in 2011 and by Complex's Drea Avellan in 2012, respectively. In 2012, Gadget Review's Kristie Bertucci rated Mileena as the "sixth-hottest" female video game character and noted her being "usually always at the top of the list as one of the most popular female characters (not to mention sexy)" in all video games. Larry Hester of Complex ranked Mileena herself as the "eighth-hottest" video game character in 2012, writing "Mileena is what some guys would call a paper bagger" due to the stark contrast between her body and her mouth. while Playboy included Mileena, Kitana, and Jade together in their list of "the hottest video game breasts of all time" at 19th place. She was one of the most searched game characters on Pornhub in 2016.

Mileena has been renowned as a notable female villain in video gaming. In 2009, Gelo Gonzales of FHM listed the "menacing" character in his selection of the nine sexiest "bad girls of videogame land." Complex ranked her eighth on their list of the "most diabolical video game she-villains" in 2011, while Polish web portal Wirtualna Polska featured Mileena among the top ten villainesses in gaming in 2014, describing her as "absolutely phenomenal, simply dripping with sex" but advising to skip trying to check under her mask. The staff of Gameranx rated "this Mortal Kombat femme fatality" as the second-sexiest female villain in gaming for not only how "gorgeous" but also how "badass" she is. Placing Mileena 18th on his 2013 list of the most brutal fighters in Mortal Kombat, Hanuman Welch of Complex described her as a "deadly mixture of Kitana's agility and seduction, and Baraka's impulsive behavior." Mileena and Kitana were among the top ten "hottest" female villains in gaming and "old-school hotties that still got it" by Travis Hubert of Cheat Code Central in 2014. Márcio Pacheco Alexsandro of Brazil's Game Hall placed them both at second spot of his top list of female ninja characters in games, calling Mileena "beautiful and monstrous" and adding that there was nothing more "cool" than a ninja who is both sexy and insane.

An often commented, and referenced, aspect of Mileena is her cannibalistic tendencies. The University of Sydney's Kate Robertson analyzed Mileena's cannibalism as one of examples how "the connection between women and cannibalism reflects the common trope of the danger inherent within the female body" regarding "allure, fear and revulsion provoked by such a display of female power." Ranking 1992's Mortal Kombat as the second-most controversial violent video game in history, CNN's Doug Gross noted that in the reboot, "options include eating an opponent's head." X360 chose her MK2011 Fatality, "in which she tears a man's head off then chows down upon it," to represent cannibalism on their list of the top ten video game crimes. Praising the 2011 reboot game for its inclusion of "iconic" characters and "the quite remarkable violence," GamesMaster opined one "simply cannot watch" Mileena decapitate an opponent "and then take repeated bites out of his face like a dog on death row without deeply desiring this game." In 2015, Andrea Subissati from horror magazine Rue Morgue selected "making out with Mileena" as one of the best Fatalities in the 23 years of Mortal Kombat. Mileena's finishing move of devouring a still-living opponent in MKX was chosen as the most "hardcore" in the game by French website JeuxActu. Her own gruesome demise in the story mode of Mortal Kombat X was ranked third on Dutch XGN's 2016 list of the top death scenes in video games. In a VentureBeat humor article by Jason Lomberg, Mileena "tried her hand at stripping, modeling, and a stint on The View. But none of them could satisfy her insatiable desire for carnage and human flesh," so she became Donald Trump’s co-host on The Apprentice.

Mileena was described by Computer and Video Games as "equally erotic and repulsive." According to IGN, "at first blush she seems like your quintessential sultry video-game vixen, but the mask comes off and she's got a gaping mouth filled to the brim with dagger-like teeth." Placing Mileena and Kitana eleventh on his list of the best palette-swapped video game characters, GamePro's Aaron Koehn wrote that "if you gauge Mileena's attractiveness simply based on the size of her baby-feeders, be ready for some disappointment when she removes her mask." In 2008, IGN's Scott Collura listed "Mileen-ewwwwww" as one of "top 50 chicks behaving badly," while GamesRadar included her on the list of "gaming's most repellent anti-babes." Comparing the Mortal Kombat characters to the seven deadly sins in Dante's Inferno, Chris Holt of GamePro chose Mileena to represent Envy. ScrewAttack ranked her as seventh on their list of the top ten "ugly chicks in games" for her horrific looks when unmasked, but otherwise calling her "the ultimate woman." Virgin Media included her on their list of the ten "game girls you wouldn't dare to date" for being attractive "until she rips off her veil and reveals her monstrous form beneath." On the other hand, EGM'''s Eric L. Patterson wrote that Mileena's face is actually one of the reasons why he prefers her over Kitana. Ranking Mileena as second on his 2013 list of ugliest video game characters, Alex Langley of Arcade Sushi wrote: "If ever there were a time to use the term 'butterface' it would be with Mileena because everything about her is hot...but her face. Her face will friggin' bite your face off, which is never a sign of a good date." Ramon Hagenbeuk of XGN included Mileena among the top ten "ugly game chicks" in 2015 due to her face despite "her nice figure." French magazine Retropolis placed Mileena second in a 2013 ranking of the sexiest girls in fighting games in which her bust was the criteria for her "reverse décolleté" approach to fashion after Mortal Kombat II while comparing the character to shrimp in regards to her physical appearance: "Everything is good except for the head."

Other reception and criticism
Mileena was noted for her alternate costume apparel, in particular, her unmasked and near-naked "Flesh Pits" outfit from MK2011 that Destructoid's Hamza Aziz called "the new winner for skimpiest 'outfit' in a videogame ever." GamesRadar's Matt Bradford included it on his 2012 list of gaming's "most ridiculous" alternate fighting costumes, commenting that it "overclocks our absur[d]-o-meter." IGN featured the unmasked Mileena on their list of worst-dressed video game characters of 2011, commenting that "the term 'butter face' doesn't even begin to describe this nightmare." On the other hand, UGO ranked the "Sexy Mileena" from Deception as second-best on the 2011 list of the gaming's "most stylin' alternate costumes" and called her one of the most interesting characters in the game for having "a perfect 10 body" but "a -22 face," adding that this outfit "ramps up the sex appeal to volcanic levels." Including Mileena's "Nudality" rumor from Mortal Kombat II on her 2014 list of the top seven nude-code rumors, Ashley Reed of GamesRadar said it was "the talk of middle school hallways and sleepovers everywhere." Kotaku's Patrick Klepek, in 2015, recalled hearing about "Mileena’s sexality" while playing the game at arcades.

Mileena was one of the characters cited by Guy Aoki as allegedly perpetuating existing stereotypes of Asians as martial arts experts. In their 1996 book Interacting With Video, which condemned the violence of video games as supposedly affecting social behavior and causing real-life violence, Patricia Marks Greenfield and Rodney R. Cocking used the "two Asian twin sisters, Mileena and Kitana," as an example of a "highly eroticized dragon lady" trope, with Mileena's "Man-Eater" Fatality described as "a high-powered kiss that evokes vagina dentata." The authors wrote that despite the inclusion of "characters of color" such as the two and Jax, "we cannot assume that this greater diversity represents a more progressive identity politics, for one could argue that it merely increases the racist and sexist potential of individual fights." Critical studies professor Marsha Kinder similarly accused Mortal Kombat II of "allowing you to have a misogynistic aspect of combat," alleging that "some of the most violent possibilities are against women," whose own "fatality moves are highly eroticised." Kinder singled out Mileena to describe how the character can kill her opponent "by sucking him in and spitting out his bones. Talk about Spider-Woman!" Feminist-oriented criticism of the series and of Mileena's character, in particular, has continued in the following decades, eventually also in video game journalism. Destructoid's Brad Nicholson called her "the worst character ever created in a fighting game" in 2008.

Some commentators admitted that they found themselves too distracted by her mouth. In 2010, Game Informer included her among the palette swap characters not wanted by them in the future Mortal Kombat games, later describing her in the 2011 game as being "as creepy as ever." When American radio host Howard Stern mocked a Mortal Kombat fan who admitted that he masturbates to Mileena, Matt Helgeson of Game Informer called the latter "insane" as "onanism and Mileena should not mix." Mike Harradence of PlayStation Universe wrote that "as for the date theme [in the reboot game's trailer], frankly we can't really see the appeal – she's not a patch on Sheeva, after all." GameDaily praised the "superb fashion sense" of Soulcalibur''s Taki by contrasting her with Mileena. In an anti-sexualization paper, Federal University of Santa Catarina's Gustavo Soares Izidoro compared Mileena with Ivy Valentine from Soul Calibur.

See also
Ayane (Dead or Alive)
Cannibalism in popular culture
Juri (Street Fighter)
List of female action heroes and villains
List of Mortal Kombat characters

Notes

References

External links

Action film characters
Action film villains
Adoptee characters in video games
Clone characters in video games
Demon characters in video games
Dictator characters in video games
Emperor and empress characters in video games
Extraterrestrial characters in video games
Female characters in comics
Female characters in video games
Female film villains
Female supervillains
Female video game villains
Fictional martial artists in video games
Fictional Mian Quan practitioners
Fictional Ninjutsu practitioners
Fictional assassins in video games
Fictional bisexual females
Fictional cannibals
Fictional characters with neurological or psychological disorders
Fictional characters with psychiatric disorders
Fictional female martial artists
Fictional female ninja
Fictional half-demons
Fictional hybrids
Fictional knife-fighters
Fictional mass murderers
Fictional murderers
Fictional secret agents and spies in video games
Fictional serial killers
Fictional soul collectors
Fictional swordfighters in video games
Fictional taekwondo practitioners
Fictional warlords in video games
Genetically engineered characters in video games
Mortal Kombat characters
Mutant characters in video games
Ninja characters in video games
Princess characters in video games
Telepath characters in video games
Twin characters in video games
Video game antagonists
Video game bosses
Video game characters introduced in 1993
Video game characters who can teleport
Video game mascots
Woman soldier and warrior characters in video games